"Naked and Famous" is a song by the American alternative rock band The Presidents of the United States of America. It was the band's second single. "Naked and Famous" was later released on the Presidents' debut album and features Soundgarden's Kim Thayil on guitar. A version of the single’s B-side, "Puffy Little Shoes", appeared on the band’s second album, II.

The song was composed in the key of D-flat major.

There were two different versions of the cover. Both were limited to only 1000, numbered by hand. The first was pulled from shelves due to possible legal action.  Both variants were made by Che Orrie under special license from PopLlama Records. The original cover featured Vanna White's upper body (front cover) and C-3PO's legs (back cover). Numbers for the first versions are unknown. One thousand were made, but due to the recall, the total number sold remains a mystery. Due to this, the single tends to be highly sought after by collectors.

The song was written in the early 1980s by future PUSA bandleader Chris Ballew and performed in several bands he fronted during that time, most notably Egg, who released versions on their 1987 album Feel Better and their 1989 album Smell Me Fist.

Track listing
 "Naked & Famous" - 3:42
 "Puffy Little Shoes" - 3:35

References

1994 singles
The Presidents of the United States of America (band) songs
Songs written by Chris Ballew
1987 songs